WRRQ may refer to:

 WRRQ-LP, a low-power radio station (96.9 FM) licensed to serve Cocoa, Florida, United States
 WCDW, a radio station (106.7 FM) licensed to serve Port Dickinson, New York, United States, which held the call sign WRRQ from 2006 to 2013